Gossau SG railway station is a railway station in Gossau, in the Swiss canton of St. Gallen. It is an intermediate station on the St. Gallen–Winterthur line and the terminus of the Sulgen–Gossau and  Gossau–Wasserauen lines.

Services 
 the following services stop at Gossau SG:

 St. Gallen S-Bahn:
 : half-hourly service over the Gossau–Wasserauen line to Wasserauen.

References

External links 
 
 

Railway stations in the canton of St. Gallen
Swiss Federal Railways stations